Foscue Plantation House is a historic plantation house located near Pollocksville, Jones County, North Carolina. It was built about 1801, and is a two-story, three bay, side hall plan brick dwelling.  It rests on a full raised brick basement and has a gable roof.

It was listed on the National Register of Historic Places in 1971. The house is located in the Foscue and Simmons Plantations historic district.

References

Plantation houses in North Carolina
Houses on the National Register of Historic Places in North Carolina
Houses completed in 1801
Houses in Jones County, North Carolina
National Register of Historic Places in Jones County, North Carolina
Historic district contributing properties in North Carolina